"I See the Want To in Your Eyes" is a song written by Wayne Carson. The song was first recorded by honky-tonk singer Gary Stewart and appeared on his 1975 album Out of Hand.  American country music artist Conway Twitty heard Stewart's version on the radio and decided to record it.  Twitty's version was released in July 1974 as the second single from the album I'm Not Through Loving You Yet.  The song was Twitty's 11th number one on the country chart.  The single stayed at number one for two weeks and spent a total of 13 weeks on the chart.

Popular culture
A filmed performance of Twitty on That Good Ole Nashville Music singing the song which was infamously featured in "The Juice Is Loose", an episode of Family Guy. The song was aired in its entirety.

Personnel
Conway Twitty — vocals
Harold Bradley — 6-string electric bass guitar
Ray Edenton — acoustic guitar
John Hughey — steel guitar
Tommy "Porkchop" Markham — drums
Grady Martin — electric guitar
Bob Moore — bass
Hargus "Pig" Robbins — piano

Chart performance

References

1974 singles
Conway Twitty songs
Gary Stewart (singer) songs
Songs written by Wayne Carson
Song recordings produced by Owen Bradley
MCA Records singles
1974 songs